George Wardlaw (born 18 July 2004) is a professional Australian rules footballer who was drafted to play for North Melbourne in the Australian Football League (AFL) in the 2022 draft.

Early life 
Wardlaw completed his secondary education at St Kevin's College in Toorak, Victoria. He was selected for Vic Metro in the NAB AFL Under 18 Championships and played for Oakleigh Chargers in the NAB League. Despite several injuries to his hamstring in the 2022 year, he was still considered to be among the top prospects in the 2022 AFL Draft.

As a midfielder he has been described as 'powerful' and drawn comparisons to Melbourne Demons star Clayton Oliver.

Wardlaw attracted favourable attention from the AFL community after his performance for the Australian Academy team against the Collingwood Magpies VFL side where he won the 'best on ground' award for his team with 18 disposals and 8 tackles.

He is a close friend of fellow 2022 draftee Elijah Tsatas, with the pair having played together since the age of 11 for various Vic Metro teams.

Wardlaw grew up supporting the Essendon Bombers.

AFL career 
Wardlaw was highly rated by recruiters and deemed likely to be selected in the first 5 picks of the 2022 AFL Draft. He was selected by North Melbourne Football Club using pick number 4.

References 

Living people
2004 births